Sapura Group also known as Sapura is a Malaysian public limited company based in Kuala Lumpur that mainly engaged in oil and gas, manufacturing engineering, property, aviation, defence and rail construction. Formed in 1975 by its founder Abdul Kadir Shamsuddin, this company was named after his wife, Siti Sapura.

History

At the beginning, Sapura starts their business only with six staff in one-room office. Company mainly involves in telecommunication industry early back then with the purchase of Uniphone Works from United Motor Works (UMW) (now UMW Holdings) in 1975. After the success of their early establishment, in 1980s Sapura acquired Malayan Cable Berhad to strengthen its presence in telecommunication industry.

By 1991, Sapura consisted of 30 subsidiaries and two publicly listed company. With its rapid expansion, Sapura not just focus in telecommunication industry but also stepping in automotive industry by establishing Sapura Motor Berhad in 1994. Sapura Motor Berhad later listed in main board of Bursa Malaysia and renamed as Sapura Industrial Berhad.

Expansion later continued with the establishment of new divisions such as Sapura Energy Berhad, Sapura Resources Berhad, Sapura Aero Sdn Bhd and Sapura Secured Technologies. This division involves in their expertise field including oil and gas, manufacturing engineering, property, aviation, defence and rail construction. Sapura now owned more than 6000 employees and presence in more than 15 countries.

Divisions and core businesses

Sapura Energy Berhad

Division that engaged in oil and gas industry. Sapura Energy Berhad core business includes:
Engineering and construction of offshore platforms and marine pipelines for oil exploration. 
Operations and maintenance of offshore platforms and pipelines.
Drilling and completion of wells.
Exploration and production of oil and gas.

Sapura Industrial Berhad
Division that engaged in automotive manufacturing. Established as Sapura Motor Berhad in 1994 then renamed as Sapura Industrial Berhad in 2004 after listed on main board of Bursa Malaysia. The core business of this division includes manufacture of machine engine, transmission, brake component, stabilizer bars, suspension systems and automotive module assemblies.

Sapura Resources Berhad
Sapura Group property division. The establishment of this divisions is to provides the development and rental of building and land such as offices, warehouses, commercial buildings and hangar for aircraft.

Sapura Aero
As a division that involved in aviation sector, Sapura Aero provides private aviation services includes mission planning, aircraft management and charter service. Sapura Aero based in Sultan Abdul Aziz Shah Airport and Senai International Airport.

Sapura Secured Technologies
Sapura Secured Technologies is the Sapura Group defence division that involved more in defence electronic and systems integration. This division provides communication systems, tactical systems, command and control systems, training and simulation systems and surveillance systems. Sapura Secured Technologies also involved in Malaysian Armed Forces Network Centric Operation (NCO) program by providing satelitte and ground communication systems and integrated mission system for the interoperability information sharing.

References

Companies listed on Bursa Malaysia
Oil and gas companies of Malaysia
Defense companies of Malaysia
Companies based in Kuala Lumpur